Double Cross: Ek Dhoka is a 2005 Indian Drama film starring Negar Khan and her ex-husband, Sahil Khan. Negar Khan plays the role of a wife who is the bread-winner of the family. Ayesha Jhulka is Sonia, who coerces her husband to be a gigolo. The movie was the first leading actress role for Negar Khan.

Cast 
 Negar Khan as Negar
 Sahil Khan as Sahil
 Ayesha Jhulka as Sonia

Music
Aao Huzoor Tumko (Kismat) - Saswati Phukan, Suzanne D'Mello
Hum Bewafa - Kishore Kumar
Jaanu Meri Jaan -  Mohd Rafi, Asha Bhosle, Usha Mangeshkar, Kishore Kumar
Kya Ghazab Karte Ho Ji - Neena Saikia
Laila O Laila - Amit Kumar, Kanchan
Mere Naseeb Mein - Saswati Phukan
Nahin Nahin - Kishore Kumar, Asha Bhosle
Pyar Do Pyar Lo - Sapna Mukherjee
Udi Baba - Vijay Prakash, Vaishali Samant
Vaada Na Tod - Varsha, Xenia Ali

References

External links

 
 Interview with Sahil Khan

2005 films
2000s Hindi-language films
Films scored by O. P. Nayyar
Films scored by R. D. Burman
Films scored by Kalyanji Anandji
Films scored by Laxmikant–Pyarelal
Films scored by Rajesh Roshan